Pyka is a surname. Notable people with the surname include:

 Alfred Pyka (1934–2012), German footballer
 Reemt Pyka (born 1969), German ice hockey player
 Tadeusz Pyka (1930–2009), Polish politician

See also
 Pyke